Raffael Tonello (born 14 June 1975) is an Italian former footballer who played as a striker. He spent his entire career in Germany.

References

1975 births
Living people
Association football forwards
Italian footballers
Bundesliga players
Fortuna Düsseldorf players
Sportfreunde Siegen players
KFC Uerdingen 05 players
Kickers Offenbach players
Eintracht Frankfurt II players